George Isaac Davies Lavelle (born 24 March 2000) is an English professional cricketer. He plays as a wicket-keeper batsman. Lavelle signed his first professional contract with Lancashire in November 2018, having played for Lancashire's second XI and represented England at Under-19 level earlier that year. His deal was extended in November 2019. He made his first-class debut on 6 September 2020, for Lancashire in the 2020 Bob Willis Trophy. He made his Twenty20 debut 17 September 2020, for Lancashire in the 2020 t20 Blast. He made his List A debut on 23 July 2021, for Lancashire in the 2021 Royal London One-Day Cup.

References

External links
 

2000 births
Living people
English cricketers
Lancashire cricketers
Place of birth missing (living people)